Wangfujing is a Chinese department store based in Beijing. Through a joint venture with Japanese department store Ito-Yokado, Wangfujing Yokado opened China's first full-scale food supermarket. Both companies each have a 40 per cent stake. Japanese supermarket operator York-Benimaru Co. has the remaining 20 per cent. It welcomes more than 10 million customers per day. It uses cloud computing services from IBM.

External links
Wangfujing Department Store

Department stores of China
Companies with year of establishment missing